Alexander St. Clair (April 17, 1845 – October 21, 1921) was an American farmer, banker, and politician who served as a member of the Virginia Senate.

His home, the Alexander St. Clair House, is on the National Register of Historic Places.

References

External links
 

1845 births
1921 deaths
Democratic Party Virginia state senators
19th-century American politicians
20th-century American politicians
People from Tazewell County, Virginia